Gabulan (also Romanized as Gabūlān; also known as Gabūl) is a village in Jahliyan Rural District, in the Central District of Konarak County, Sistan and Baluchestan Province, Iran. At the 2006 census, its population was 554, in 88 families.

References 

Populated places in Konarak County